Blu Telecommunications is a Ghanaian-owned telecommunications company, one of the newest telecommunications companies in Ghana that were awarded the rights to provide 4G LTE in the country. It started its commercialization in October 2014 with coverage in some selected parts of the country: Accra and Tema.

References

Telecommunications in Ghana